"Almost Gold" is a song by Scottish alternative rock group the Jesus and Mary Chain, released as the third single from the group's fourth studio album, Honey's Dead (1992).  It was released by Blanco y Negro Records on 22 June 1992 and reached number 41 on the UK Single Chart.

Track listings
All tracks were written by Jim Reid and William Reid except where noted. All live tracks were recorded by BBC at the Sheffield Arena on 14 May 1992.

7-inch single (NEG57)
 "Almost Gold" – 3:16
 "Teenage Lust" (acoustic version) – 2:23

10-inch single (NEG57TE)
 "Almost Gold" – 3:16
 "Catchfire" (live) – 4:29
 "Blues from a Gun" (live) – 4:12
 "Head On" (live) – 4:00

12-inch and CD single (NEG57T; NEG57CD)
 "Almost Gold" – 3:16
 "Teenage Lust" (acoustic version) – 2:23
 "Reverberation (Doubt)" (Roky Erickson, Tommy Hall, Stacy Sutherland) – 3:45
 "Don't Come Down" – 2:38

Personnel
The Jesus and Mary Chain
 Jim Reid – vocals, guitar, production
 William Reid – vocals, guitar, production

Additional personnel
 Alan Moulder – engineering ("Almost Gold")
 Georg Kaleve – engineering ("Teenage Lust")
 Dick Meaney – engineering ("Don't Come Down")
 Mark Radcliffe – production (live tracks)
 Greg Jakobek – design

Charts

References

The Jesus and Mary Chain songs
1992 singles
1992 songs
American Recordings (record label) singles
Blanco y Negro Records singles
Songs written by Jim Reid
Songs written by William Reid (musician)